Ian Crawford may refer to:

 Ian Crawford (astrobiologist) (born 1961), professor of planetary science and astrobiology
 Ian Crawford (cricketer) (born 1954), English cricketer
 Ian Crawford (economist), professor of economics
 Ian Crawford (footballer) (1934–2007), Scottish football player and coach
 Ian Crawford (musician) (born 1989), American musician from Auburn, Washington
 Ian Crawford (admiral) (born 1930), see List of Australian admirals